Ser Jaime Lannister is a fictional character in the A Song of Ice and Fire series of fantasy novels by American author George R. R. Martin and its television adaptation Game of Thrones, where he is portrayed by Danish actor Nikolaj Coster-Waldau. Jaime becomes a prominent point of view character in the novels beginning with A Storm of Swords (2000).

Introduced in A Game of Thrones (1996), Jaime is a knight of the Kingsguard and one of the best swordsmen in the seven kingdoms. He is a member of House Lannister, the wealthiest and one of the most powerful families in the kingdom of Westeros. He is the elder son of Tywin Lannister, twin brother of Cersei, with whom he has a longstanding incestuous relationship, and brother of Tyrion. Although Jaime first appears to be unscrupulous and immoral, he later proves to be more complex, honorable, and sympathetic. His lengthy character development has been praised by critics of the novels and the television show.

Jaime is one of the most popular characters in both versions of the series. Coster-Waldau received critical praise for his portrayal and several award nominations including a Saturn Award for Best Supporting Actor on Television, a Critics' Choice Television Award for Best Supporting Actor in a Drama Series, People's Choice Awards Favorite TV Anti-Hero, and two Primetime Emmy Award for Outstanding Supporting Actor in a Drama Series nominations. He and the rest of the cast were nominated for five Screen Actors Guild Awards for Outstanding Performance by an Ensemble in a Drama Series.

Character description

In A Game of Thrones (1996), Jaime is introduced as one of the Kingsguard, the royal security detail, the son of the wealthy and powerful Tywin Lannister (the former Hand of the King), and one of the greatest swordsmen in the Seven Kingdoms with few able to match him, such as Ned Stark, Jon Snow and Brienne of Tarth. Jaime's twin is Cersei, the Queen of Westeros by virtue of her marriage to King Robert Baratheon. Perhaps the greatest swordsman in the kingdom, Jaime is derisively referred to as "the Kingslayer" because he killed the "Mad King" Aerys Targaryen in the coup that put Robert on the Iron Throne.

Eric Dodds of TIME described Jaime as "handsome, an incomparably skilled fighter and disarmingly witty". The New Yorker called the Lannisters "a crowd of high-cheekboned beauties ... who form a family constellation so twisted, charismatic, and cruel that it rivals Flowers in the Attic for blond dysfunction". Lev Grossman wrote for TIME that while Jaime and Cersei's younger brother Tyrion is a grotesque dwarf, "the rest of the Lannisters are stunted too, but on the inside." The Los Angeles Times called Jaime "handsome and unscrupulous", though Dodds noted in 2014:

Darren Franich of Entertainment Weekly noted that in the novels, "[Jaime is] a vaguely villainous minor character in Game of Thrones, then is basically absent from Clash of Kings, and suddenly he becomes a tragic hero in Storm of Swords." In A Game of Thrones, Jaime is not only carrying on an incestuous affair with his twin sister, but he pushes a young Bran Stark out a high window to his likely death after the boy witnesses them in the act. Jaime admits these crimes to Catelyn Stark in A Clash of Kings (1998), and tells her a horrific story of Aerys Targaryen's cruelty. In A Storm of Swords (2000), Jaime initially loathes the female warrior Brienne of Tarth, but both his honor and his reluctant respect for Brienne compel him to lie to their captors to prevent her from being raped. He later explains to Brienne that he killed Aerys because the king had planned to incinerate all of King's Landing and its inhabitants rather than let it fall into Robert's hands. When Jaime is released to be sent back to King's Landing in deference to his father, he first saves Brienne, who has been thrown into a bear pit for the mercenaries' amusement. Martin told Rolling Stone in 2014:

Specifically addressing Jaime's attempted murder of Bran, Martin said:

Storylines

A Game of Thrones

Jaime Lannister accompanies the royal family to Winterfell, where King Robert Baratheon hopes to persuade his old friend Ned Stark to serve as Hand of the King. During the visit, Ned's young son Bran inadvertently spies Jaime and Cersei having sex in a remote tower, at which point Jaime pushes the boy out a window, intending to kill Bran to keep their relationship secret. Bran survives, though crippled and with no recollection of the incident. When an assassin later tries to kill Bran, his mother Catelyn Stark accuses and arrests Tyrion. In revenge, Jaime instigates a brawl with Ned and his men in the streets of King's Landing, killing many on both sides, including Jory Cassel, the Captain of Ned's household guards. Ned later discovers that Robert's three children are actually the products of Jaime and Cersei's affair, but is executed by the oldest child, Joffrey Baratheon, upon the latter's ascension as king. Jaime then rides for the Riverlands to aid Tywin in his campaign against the Riverlands, taking command of half the Lannister host. He besieges the Riverlands' capital of Riverrun, but his army is waylaid by Robb Stark's army in the Battle of the Whispering Wood. Jaime is taken prisoner and incarcerated in Riverrun. In the meantime, Joffrey has named Jaime as commander of his Kingsguard.

Hillary Busis of Entertainment Weekly called the twist of Jaime and Cersei in the tower "lurid and shocking, exactly what I needed to jolt me awake and make me start paying closer attention ... By the end of the chapter — 'The things I do for love' — I was totally hooked on Thrones". Mikal Gilmore of Rolling Stone noted in 2014 that the moment in which Jaime pushes Bran to his likely death "grabs you by the throat". Martin commented in the interview:

A Clash of Kings

Tyrion makes several attempts to free Jaime, first by having disguised Lannister guards attempt to break him out and then by offering to swap Arya Stark and Sansa Stark for Jaime. After hearing of the supposed deaths of Bran and Rickon Stark, Catelyn interrogates Jaime. Jaime admits to pushing Bran out the tower window, to his incest with Cersei and to fathering her children. Jaime then mocks Ned for having tarnished his own honour by fathering a bastard, prompting Catelyn to call her bodyguard Brienne of Tarth for her sword.

A Storm of Swords

Jaime is freed by Catelyn and sent to King's Landing to exchange for Sansa and Arya, escorted by Brienne of Tarth and Jaime's cousin Ser Cleos Frey. Cleos is killed by bandits and Jaime and Brienne are captured by the Brave Companions, who were formerly in service to Tywin but have defected to Roose Bolton. Their leader, Vargo Hoat, cuts off Jaime's sword hand in the hope that Tywin will blame Roose and prevent the Boltons defecting to the Lannisters.  While held captive at Harrenhal, Jaime reveals to Brienne the circumstances surrounding his murder of King Aerys. Roose Bolton releases Jaime but keeps Brienne hostage. While returning to King's Landing, Jaime has a dream about Brienne and decides to return to Harrenhal to rescue her from Hoat.

Continuing on to King's Landing, Jaime and Brienne learn that Robb and Catelyn have been murdered at the Red Wedding, and that Joffrey has been poisoned, with Tyrion on trial for the murder; Jaime refuses to believe Tyrion is guilty. Tywin gifts Jaime with a Valyrian steel sword forged from House Stark's ancestral sword Ice and reveals that he plans to have Jaime released from his vows to the Kingsguard, disowning him when Jaime declines. Jaime passes the sword on to Brienne and tasks her with finding and protecting the fugitive Sansa Stark. He then forces Varys into helping Tyrion escape, confessing to Tyrion that he owed him a debt for his role in Tysha's fate. Outraged, Tyrion spitefully reveals to Jaime Cersei's affairs during his imprisonment, swears vengeance on Jaime and the rest of House Lannister, and lies that he did indeed kill Joffrey, before killing Tywin.

A Feast for Crows

Jaime and Cersei's relationship breaks down after he repeatedly declines her requests to become the new Hand of the King and he becomes more disturbed by Cersei's arrogance and impulsive leadership. Jaime tries to reconcile Kevan and Cersei, in hopes that Kevan will take the role of Hand. Kevan rebuffs Jaime's efforts, and implies that he knows of Jaime and Cersei's incestuous relationship. Cersei orders Jaime to go to Riverrun and dislodge Ser Brynden "Blackfish" Tully. Before his leaving, Jaime has an armorer forge him a prosthetic hand. He takes the tongueless Ser Ilyn Payne with him to teach him to fight with his left hand, using the lessons to confess to his numerous crimes. During the march, he encounters his cousin Lancel, who confesses to his affair with Cersei. Jaime persuades Edmure Tully to force the Blackfish's surrender by threatening to sack the castle and kill Edmure's child when it is born, though Edmure assists the Blackfish in escaping. Jaime later receives a letter from Cersei, who has been imprisoned by the High Sparrow and is awaiting trial and begs Jaime to be her champion in her trial by combat, but Jaime has the letter burned without reply.

A Dance with Dragons

Jaime travels to Raventree Hall and negotiates Lord Tytos Blackwood's surrender, officially ending House Stark's insurrection. In the aftermath, he is approached by Brienne, who claims that Sansa is in danger from Sandor "The Hound" Clegane. It is unknown how much of this is true, as Brienne was previously seen as a prisoner of Lady Stoneheart, the reanimated corpse of Catelyn Stark, and the anti-Lannister Brotherhood Without Banners.

Family tree of House Lannister

TV adaptation

Jaime is portrayed by Danish actor Nikolaj Coster-Waldau in the HBO adaptation Game of Thrones. His casting was announced on August 20, 2009.

In October 2014, Coster-Waldau and several other key cast members, all contracted for six seasons of the series, renegotiated their deals to include a potential seventh season and salary increases for seasons five, six, and seven. The Hollywood Reporter called the raises "huge", noting that the deal would make the performers "among the highest-paid actors on cable TV". Deadline Hollywood put the number for season five at "close to $300,000 an episode" for each actor, and The Hollywood Reporter wrote in June 2016 that the performers would each be paid "upward of $500,000 per episode" for seasons seven and the potential eight. In 2017, he became one of the highest paid actors on television and earned £2 million per episode for the show.

Matt Fowler of IGN noted in 2013 that "the people who do seem to get redemption arcs on this show are the villains". Over the course of the first three seasons, the series has transitioned Jaime from an obvious villain to an antihero of sorts. Eric Dodds of Time wrote that Jaime had become "a complex, bizarrely likable character". Andrew Romano of The Daily Beast explained:

Fowler wrote that Jaime's adventure with Brienne was "the best storyline of the season" in Season 3, aside from the Red Wedding.

Jaime's apparent rape of Cersei in the fourth season episode "Breaker of Chains" created controversy among fans and journalists, who debated the show's depiction of sexual violence against women as well as Jaime's character development.  The showrunners never commented on what their intention with the scene actually was.  The cast members involved initially gave only vague comments, but after the fourth season was released on Blu-ray and the showrunners avoided making any comment about the scene in it (it is conspicuously the only episode which has no commentary track), both Coster-Waldau and Headey publicly stated that the scene was never intended to portray rape at all – they were given no instructions to this effect (such as in the script) nor did they play it that way, and apparently the scene was just edited very confusingly.

In the source novel A Storm of Swords, the sex between Jaime and Cersei in the equivalent scene is consensual. Several critics argued that the TV series' change damaged Jaime's redemption arc. Dodds noted that the episode "irreparably changes the way we see Jaime Lannister". Alyssa Rosenberg of The Washington Post wrote:

Coster-Waldau said, "If you look closer there are those moments where she—well, I haven't seen the finished edit, of course—but we tried to have it where she goes into it then she pulls away, she goes in then she pulls away, but of course he is forcing himself." Later he and his co-star Lena Headey (Cersei) spoke with Entertainment Weekly during the filming of season 5, admitting that they were never directed or intended to film a rape scene. Headey stated:

The Jaime-Cersei scene was subsequently ignored for the rest of Season 4 and the rest of the series. Writing on website TheMarySue.com, Rebecca Pahle claimed that not referring to the scene again, instead of as a long and developed subplot, trivialized rape—if, in fact, it was ever the actual intention to portray it as a rape scene. Pahle argued that in real life a woman would be traumatized by being raped, not act as if nothing had happened immediately afterwards. Pahle said that even if the show's creators did not intend it as a rape scene, ignoring questions about the scene and hoping they would go away over time was insensitive to the audience.

In 2016, Christopher Hooton wrote for The Independent:

Storylines

Season 1
Jaime's storyline in the first season remains, for the most part, identical to his book storyline, with only minor details altered. Introduced in the pilot, "Winter is Coming", Jaime is established as queen Cersei Lannister's brother and a knight of King Robert Baratheon's Kingsguard. After being discovered by Brandon Stark to be having an affair with Cersei, Jaime pushes the boy to his presumed death, only for Bran to survive the fall, admittedly with life-changing injuries and little recollection of the event. As the season continues, Cersei expresses her concern to Jaime that Bran will one day remember being pushed and expose their incestuous affair, which has spawned all three of Cersei's children. Jaime soon joins his father Tywin Lannister in the field as they face off against Robb Stark's army following the imprisonment of Ned Stark in King's Landing. At the Battle of Whispering Wood, Robb captures Jaime from the Lannister forces and uses him as a hostage. In the aftermath of Jaime's capture, he confesses to Catelyn that he tried to kill Bran, but refuses to reveal why.

Season 2
Robb brings a captive Jaime with his camp as they march through the Westerlands, as Robb fears Tywin may coerce one of his bannerman into freeing Jaime. At one point Jaime attempts to escape by beating his cousin and fellow inmate Alton Lannister to death and strangling his guard Torrhen Karstark when he comes to investigate. Jaime is soon recaptured by Robb's bannermen, but the anger of Torrhen's father Rickard proves fatal for Robb's campaign in the coming months. After Jaime goads Catelyn by mentioning Ned's rumoured infidelity, she releases him and has Brienne of Tarth escort him to King's Landing to trade for her daughters, Sansa and Arya.

Season 3
After spending several weeks on the road, Jaime attempts to free himself from Brienne's escort and return home to King's Landing by himself. During his attempts to do this, however, they are soon captured by a squad of soldiers sporting the banners of House Bolton. As their prisoner, Jaime manages to convince them not to rape Brienne, but their leader Locke takes umbrage when Jaime tries to use his status to secure his own release. He chops off Jaime's sword hand. In the days following this incident, Jaime is shown to be weak and delirious, with his wound becoming increasingly infected. The two are taken to Harrenhal, where the former maester Qyburn treats Jaime's wound. Jaime reveals to Brienne the truth about why he killed the Mad King Aerys during Robert's Rebellion. Roose Bolton lets Jaime return to King's Landing but insists on keeping Brienne prisoner for abetting treason, though Jaime ultimately returns to rescue Brienne from being killed by a bear for Locke's amusement. The two return to King's Landing and Jaime is reunited with Cersei.

Season 4
Tywin gifts Jaime a Valyrian steel sword forged from House Stark's ancestral sword, Ice, and asks him to resign from the Kingsguard and rule Casterly Rock, disowning him when he refuses. Qyburn fits Jaime with a gilded steel hand, while Tyrion arranges for Jaime to have sword lessons with his bodyguard Bronn. After their son Joffrey is poisoned at his own wedding, Cersei initially refuses to resume their relationship. The two later proceed to having angry sex in front of Joffrey's body. Jaime gifts Tywin's sword to Brienne, as well as the services of Tyrion's squire Podrick Payne. Jaime tasks her to find and protect Sansa Stark. With Tyrion accused of Joffrey's murder, Jaime refuses to believe his brother is guilty. Jaime convinces Tywin to spare Tyrion in return for leaving the Kingsguard, though Tyrion later chooses trial by combat. Tyrion loses the trial and is sentenced to death, but Jaime releases him from his cell and helps him escape to Essos.

Season 5
Cersei guilts Jaime for releasing Tyrion, and Jaime later admits to Bronn that he intends to kill Tyrion the next time they meet. When a message arrives from Martells subtly threatening Myrcella as revenge for Prince Oberyn Martell's death in Tyrion's trial by combat, Jaime and Bronn travel to Dorne in secret to retrieve her. As they make their escape they are accosted by Oberyn's bastard daughters, the Sand Snakes, and engage in a fight before all five are arrested by the Water Gardens' palace guards. Doran Martell realises that the message was sent by Oberyn's paramour Ellaria Sand and decides to send Myrcella and his own son Trystane back to King's Landing with Jaime as a peace offering between the two houses. As the ship sets sail, Myrcella admits to Jaime that she has always known he is her father, and that she feels happy knowing this. The two share a brief embrace before Myrcella suddenly collapses and dies, having been poisoned by Ellaria.

Season 6
Jaime returns to King's Landing with Myrcella's corpse. He orders Trystane to stay on the boat outside the city to protect him from Cersei's wrath, and sends word to Doran naming Ellaria as Myrcella's killer. After Doran receives this news, Ellaria promptly kills Doran, sends Obara and Nymeria to King's Landing to kill Trystane, and seizes control of Dorne. At Myrcella's funeral, Jaime confronts the religious leader, the High Sparrow, for having forced Cersei to walk naked through the streets of King's Landing as punishment for adultery, but is forced to stand down at the arrival of the Faith Militant. Jaime enlists the Tyrell army to march on the Sept of Baelor to secure the release of Margaery and Loras Tyrell. However, they find that Margaery has seemingly become a follower of the High Sparrow and that Tommen has forged an alliance with the Faith Militant. As punishment for taking up arms against the Faith, Jaime is removed from the Kingsguard. He is sent to Riverrun with Bronn to assist House Frey in reclaiming the castle from Brynden "Blackfish" Tully and the occupying Tully forces. After a failed parlay, Brienne arrives and implores both Jaime and the Blackfish to end the siege without bloodshed, so the Tully rebels can help Sansa Stark retake Winterfell. Brienne fails in this task, therefore Jaime tries to peacefully persuade Edmure into surrendering the castle. Seeing that Edmure refuses to cooperate, he threatens that his son will be sent to him via catapult, which finally makes him agree to his terms of surrender. Edmure is released and promptly opens the gates to the Lannisters, and Jaime manages to resolve the siege without loss of life. Jaime sees Brienne and Podrick fleeing by boat from the castle walls, but only waves a discreet farewell and does not alert his men.

After traveling to House Frey's fortress The Twins for a feast to celebrate their victory at Riverrun, Jaime returns to King's Landing. Upon arrival, he is horrified to discover that the Great Sept of Baelor has been destroyed in a wildfire explosion, with the majority of House Tyrell and the entire Faith Militant killed in the attack. He returns to the Red Keep in time to witness Cersei being crowned as Queen of the Seven Kingdoms, immediately realizing that Cersei wiped out every high-ranking rival in the explosion in order to acquire her new power.

Season 7
Despite his discomfort at the circumstances leading to Cersei's coronation, Jaime remains loyal to his sister, with Daenerys Targaryen and her forces sailing on Westeros. Cersei agrees to marry Euron Greyjoy after the war against Daenerys is won, but continues her relationship with Jaime, no longer attempting to hide their intimacy from their servants. Jaime negotiates with Randyll Tarly to pledge allegiance to the Lannisters, and with the help of House Tarly's forces he leads the Lannister army to defeat the Tyrell army at Highgarden. The Tyrell family matriarch, Lady Olenna, had defected to Daenerys following Cersei's role in the death of the other Tyrells. In the aftermath of the battle, Jaime allows Olenna a painless suicide-via-poison, rather than the torturous death Cersei had ordered. Before dying, Olenna reveals she was responsible for poisoning Joffrey.

As the Lannister forces return to King's Landing via road, they are ambushed by Daenerys' Dothraki forces. Their army is nearly completely destroyed in the attack, until Bronn temporarily wounds Drogon with a scorpion ballista. Jaime attempts a desperate, horseback lance charge on the dismounted Daenerys, but only escapes being burnt to death when Bronn intervenes. The two men plunge into the Blackwater Rush, and are carried downstream, away from the carnage of Daenerys' victory. They return to King's Landing, where Jaime warns Cersei of certain defeat should Daenerys escalate the conflict. Cersei is not entirely convinced of that or Olenna's confession.

Bronn takes Jaime to the Red Keep cellars under the pretense of more training. However, Tyrion (now Hand to Daenerys after his journey in Essos) is there for a parley. Tyrion wants a truce between the two queens in order to form an alliance against the White Walkers, as well as a meeting between Daenerys and Cersei to present evidence of the danger. Jaime is convinced by Tyrion and relays the message to Cersei, who is skeptical, but remains adamant that the Lannisters will prevail against any foe. She also reveals that she is pregnant with Jaime's child.

At the meeting in King's Landing, Jon Snow and the Hound present an undead wight to Cersei's court, and Jaime realizes the impending doom. After some persuasion from Tyrion, Cersei relents to sending the Lannister forces north against the Army of the Dead. However, Cersei reveals to Jaime that she had no intention of sending the Lannister army north to assist in the fight. Instead, she has ordered Euron Greyjoy to travel to Essos and retrieve the Golden Company, an army of sellswords, and wait for the Northern forces to be weakened (or eliminated). Upon learning this, Jaime decides to head North alone, and leaves King's Landing as winter arrives.

Season 8
Jaime arrives in Winterfell and encounters Bran, who has been waiting for him in the courtyard. He is visibly shocked to see the Stark boy again. Brought before Daenerys and the Northern lords, Jaime justifies his actions against the Starks and Targaryens as being in service to House Lannister. Brienne vouches for Jaime, citing his protection of her from Roose Bolton's soldiers, and Sansa and Jon Snow let him live. Afterwards, Jaime speaks to Bran alone in the Godswood and apologizes for trying to kill him; however, Bran holds no anger towards Jaime for his deeds. Jaime also speaks with Brienne and declares that he wishes to fight under her command in the upcoming battle against the White Walkers. Later, drinking with Brienne and others before battle, Jaime knights Brienne. Jaime fights the Army of the Dead in the Battle of Winterfell alongside Brienne and the others; both survive as the living win. After the battle, Jaime shares an intimate moment with Brienne.

After learning that Daenerys' army are planning to seize King's Landing and execute Cersei, Jaime ignores Brienne's pleas and leaves for King's Landing to aid his sister. Daenerys' forces capture him on the road, but Tyrion frees him so that he can surrender on Cersei's behalf and take her away from King's Landing and Westeros. Jaime enters King's Landing during the battle between Daenerys' and Cersei's forces. As the city falls, Euron attacks and grievously wounds Jaime, but Jaime manages to kill him. Jaime reunites with Cersei in the Red Keep - the pair are killed when the dungeon vaults of the castle collapse over them during the sacking of the city. In the series finale, titled "The Iron Throne", Tyrion discovers Jaime and Cersei's bodies buried under the rubble in the crypt under the Red Keep and, in his grief, renounces his loyalty to Daenerys and persuades Jon Snow to kill her. Later on, Brienne records Jaime's accomplishments and writes that he "died protecting his queen."

Reception and recognition
Matt Roush wrote for TV Guide that Coster-Waldau plays "dastardly" Jaime "with malevolent charisma", and Dodds noted that, despite the "despicable things" he has done, "the Kingslayer remains one of Game of Thrones most popular characters". Matthew Gilbert of The Boston Globe wrote:

Coster-Waldau received several nominations for his portrayal of Jaime, including the Critics' Choice Television Award for Best Supporting Actor in a Drama Series in 2013, the Satellite Award for Best Supporting Actor in a Series, Miniseries or Television Film in 2013, the People's Choice Award for Favorite TV Anti-Hero in 2014, the Saturn Award for Best Supporting Actor on Television in 2014, the Zulu Award for Best Actor in 2017, and two Primetime Emmy Award for Outstanding Supporting Actor in a Drama Series nominations.

References

A Song of Ice and Fire characters
Fictional amputees
Fictional bodyguards
Literary characters introduced in 1996
Fictional characters involved in incest
Fictional characters who committed familicide
Fictional commanders
Fictional knights
Fictional lords and ladies
Fictional murderers
Fictional regicides
Fictional prisoners of war
Fictional swordfighters
Fictional twins
Fictional war veterans
Male characters in literature
Male characters in television
Television characters introduced in 2011